Saint-Mard-sur-Auve is a commune in the Marne department in North-Eastern France.

See also
Communes of the Marne department

References

Saintmardsurauve